Marco Stark may refer to:

 Marco Stark (German footballer) (born 1981), German footballer for Wormatia Worms
 Marco Stark (Austrian footballer) (born 1993), Austrian footballer for SC Austria Lustenau